Martinotti may refer to:

Martinotti cell, small multipolar neurons with short branching dendrites
Metodo Martinotti, an Italian industrial method for the sparkling wine production

People
Evangelista Martinotti (1634–1694), an Italian painter of the Baroque period
Brian R. Martinotti (born 1961), a United States District judge 
 Federico Martinotti (1860–1924), developer of the Charmat method in sparkling wine production

See also 
Martini (disambiguation)